Kenneth Allison Roberts (November 1, 1912 – May 9, 1989) was a U.S. Representative from Alabama.

Biography
Born in Piedmont, Alabama, Roberts attended the public schools and Howard College, Birmingham, Alabama. He was graduated from the University of Alabama Law School in 1935 and admitted to the bar in 1936. He practiced law in Anniston, Alabama (1936) and in Talladega (1937–1942).

Roberts was elected to the Alabama State Senate in 1942 and resigned the same year to enter the United States Navy. He served in both Atlantic and Pacific Theaters until discharged as a lieutenant in 1945. He was president of Piedmont Development Co. from 1945 to 1950. From 1948 to 1950 he served as member of Alabama State Board of Veterans Affairs and city attorney of Piedmont, Alabama.

Roberts was elected as a Democrat to the Eighty-second and to the six succeeding Congresses (January 3, 1951 – January 3, 1965). He was wounded in the 1954 United States Capitol shooting. Having been a signatory to the 1956 Southern Manifesto that opposed the desegregation of public schools ordered by the Supreme Court in Brown v. Board of Education, he voted against H.R. 6127, Civil Rights Act of 1957. He was an unsuccessful candidate for reelection in 1964 to the Eighty-ninth Congress.

Roberts led the establishment of federal safety legislation through the House of Representatives subcommittee on traffic safety which was formed in 1956.

In 1963 he introduced the U.S. Clean Air Act.

He resumed the practice of law until his retirement in 1979. From 1965 to 1972 he was Counsel for the Vehicle Equipment Safety Commission. He served as member of the National Highway Safety Advisory Committee from 1966 to 1970.

He was a resident of Anniston, Alabama until his death due to congestive heart failure in Potomac, Maryland, on May 9, 1989. He was interred at Arlington National Cemetery.

See also
United States Congress members killed or wounded in office

Bibliography

References

|-

1912 births
1989 deaths
20th-century American politicians
Democratic Party Alabama state senators
American shooting survivors
Burials at Arlington National Cemetery
Democratic Party members of the United States House of Representatives from Alabama
People from Piedmont, Alabama
Politicians from Anniston, Alabama
Samford University alumni
United States Navy officers
United States Navy personnel of World War II
University of Alabama School of Law alumni
American segregationists